The Vermilion Valley Conference  is a high school conference in east-central Illinois, in the United States. The conference participates in athletics and activities in the Illinois High School Association. The conference comprises 13 small public high schools and one small private school, with enrollments between 100 and 400 students in Edgar, Iroquois and Vermilion counties counties.

History 

In 2020, the conference expanded its football presence by adding several schools from other conferences into a "football only", two division league. Schools from the Tri-County Conference; including Dwight and Seneca, as well as Clifton Central, Iroquois West and Watseka from the Sangamon Valley Conference united under the Vermilion Valley moniker. The two divisions included a North Division of Seneca, Momence, Dwight, Clifton Central, Watseka and Iroquois West and a South Division of Hoopeston Area, Georgetown-Ridge Farm, Westville, Bismarck-Henning-Rossville-Alvin, Salt Fork and Oakwood. This unusual mix of three conferences only lasted two years with the development of the Chicago Prairie Football League.

Member schools

Previous Members

Sources:IHSA Conferences, and IHSA Member Schools Directory

Membership timeline

References

High school sports conferences and leagues in the United States
Illinois high school sports conferences
High school sports in Illinois
1933 establishments in Illinois
2003 establishments in Illinois